Barrio Fino FC is a Belizean football team and formerly of the Super League of Belize.

The Team is based in Belmopan.  Their home stadium is Isidoro Beaton Stadium.

Team history and management 
Composed mostly of high school and university students, it has been active in the Belmopan Football Association tournaments for the last 3 years and has been the Sub-Champs for two of those years.

The team is managed by Cyrus Mira, Billy Mira and Brian Mira, three brothers from Belmopan, who also share the Coaching title.

Sponsorship 

Sponsorship of this team is shared between F.T. Williams and Associates, Refritech, The Vista Group of Companies and Triple-J Boats.

See also 
 Super League of Belize

Football clubs in Belize
Super League of Belize
2006 establishments in Belize
Association football clubs established in 2006